The mayor of Palmerston North is the head of the municipal government of Palmerston North, New Zealand, and presides over the Palmerston North City Council. The current mayor is Grant Smith, who became mayor in a February 2015 by-election. This resulted from the resignation of Jono Naylor in October 2014 after his election to the House of Representatives. Since the 2013 election, Palmerston North is one of the few councils that uses the single transferable vote electoral system for the election of mayor.

Voting system
Council elections were annually at first, and biennial since 1914. The mayor is directly elected using a single transferable vote electoral system, starting with the 2013 election, and with a first past the post system earlier.

History
The Borough Council was established on 12 July 1877. At the time, Palmerston North was an isolated village in the midst of a native forest that covered inland Manawatu. The population was approximately 800 people. The first elections on 9 August 1877 returned a council with nine members, including George Snelson as the first mayor. Snelson is regarded as the founding father of Palmerston North.

On 1 August 1930, Palmerston North was officially gazetted as a city, the 7th settlement in New Zealand to have reached the then-threshold of 20,000 inhabitants. With that, the Borough Council became a city council.

Grant Smith was elected in his place in 2015, with the previous deputy mayor Jim Jefferies having been acting mayor in the intervening period.

There have been 29 holders of the position. The longest-serving was Gus Mansford, who held the post for 16 years. Jill White was the first female mayor in 1998, since followed by Heather Tanguay in 2004.

Three mayors have held non-consecutive terms:
George Snelson (4 separate periods)
James Linton
William Thomas Wood

Five mayors also served as members of Parliament:
William Thomas Wood (1902–1908)
Jimmy Nash (1918–1935)
Blair Tennent (1945–1954; 1957–1964)
Jill White (1993–1998)
Jono Naylor (2014–2017)

Of those, Nash and Tennent have fulfilled the role of mayor and member of parliament concurrently:
Nash for five years (1918–1923)
Tennent for two years (1957–1959)

List of mayors of Palmerston North

The following persons have served as mayor of Palmerston North:

List of deputy mayors of Palmerston North

References

 
Palmerston North